The 1996 United States Senate election in Michigan was held on November 5, 1996. Incumbent Democratic U.S. Senator Carl Levin won re-election to a fourth term.

General election

Candidates
 Carl Levin, incumbent U.S. Senator (Democratic)
 Joseph S. Mattingly (Natural Law)
 Martin P. McLaughlin (Socialist)
 Kenneth L. Proctor (Libertarian)
 Ronna Romney, radio talk show host and former daughter-in-law of Michigan governor George W. Romney (Republican)
 William Roundtree (Workers' World)

Results

See also 
 1996 United States Senate elections

References 

Michigan
1996
1996 Michigan elections